Garry Frank "Duke" Edmundson (May 6, 1932 – September 20, 2016) was a Canadian professional ice hockey player who played 43 games in the National Hockey League with the Toronto Maple Leafs and Montreal Canadiens between 1952 and 1960. The rest of his career, which lasted from 1952 to 1964, was spent in the minor leagues. He died September 20, 2016 in Newport Beach California.

Career statistics

Regular season and playoffs

Awards and achievements
 IHL First All-Star Team (1956)
 IHL Second All-Star Team (1957)

References

External links
 

1932 births
2016 deaths
Canadian ice hockey defencemen
Cincinnati Mohawks (IHL) players
Kitchener Greenshirts players
Montreal Canadiens players
Montreal Royals (QSHL) players
New Westminster Royals (WHL) players
Regina Pats players
Rochester Americans players
San Francisco Seals (ice hockey) players
Shawinigan-Falls Cataracts (QSHL) players
Springfield Indians players
Toronto Maple Leafs players
Winnipeg Warriors (minor pro) players